Philipp Wiesinger (born 23 May 1994) is an Austrian professional footballer who plays as a defender for Austrian Bundesliga club LASK Linz and the Austria national team.

International career
He made his debut for Austria national football team on 11 November 2020 in a friendly game against Luxembourg. He started the game and scored the last goal in added time to establish the final score of 3–0.

References

External links
 
 
 

1994 births
Living people
Association football defenders
Association football midfielders
Austrian footballers
Austria under-21 international footballers
Austria international footballers
FC Liefering players
LASK players
FC Juniors OÖ players
2. Liga (Austria) players